Hypseleotris is a genus of fishes in the family Eleotridae. Most are from fresh water in Australia and New Guinea, but species in fresh  and brackish water are found around  islands in the western Indian Ocean, southern and eastern Africa, southern and eastern Asia, and Pacific islands. They are sometimes seen in the aquarium trade; especially H. compressa. In Australia they are known as carp gudgeons.

The assemblage of species of this genus which occurs in the basin of the Murray-Darling river system is made up of sexually reproducing species and hybrid lineages which consiste of a single sex and which have arisen through hybridisation, a process known as hybridogenesis. The single sex species require gametes from the sexual species to reproduce and could be regarded as sexual parasites and in "closed populations" this sexual parasitism can cause the extinction of such populations.

Species
The 16 recognized species in this genus are:
 Hypseleotris aurea (Shipway, 1950) (golden gudgeon)
 Hypseleotris barrawayi Larson, 2007
 Hypseleotris compressa (J. L. G. Krefft, 1864) (empire gudgeon)
 Hypseleotris compressocephalus (W. Chen, 1985)
 Hypseleotris cyprinoides (Valenciennes, 1837) (tropical carp-gudgeon)
 Hypseleotris ejuncida Hoese & G. R. Allen, 1982 (Slender gudgeon)
 Hypseleotris everetti (Boulenger, 1895)
 Hypseleotris galii (J. D. Ogilby, 1898) (firetail gudgeon)
 Hypseleotris guentheri (Bleeker, 1875)
 Hypseleotris hotayensis (Đ. Y. Mai, 1978)
 Hypseleotris kimberleyensis Hoese & G. R. Allen, 1982 (Barnett River gudgeon)
 Hypseleotris klunzingeri (J. D. Ogilby, 1898) (western carp gudgeon)
 Hypseleotris leuciscus (Bleeker, 1853)
 Hypseleotris pangel Herre, 1927
 Hypseleotris regalis Hoese & G. R. Allen, 1982 (Prince Regent gudgeon)
 Hypseleotris tohizonae (Steindachner, 1880)

References

 
Eleotridae
Ray-finned fish genera
Taxa named by Theodore Gill
Taxonomy articles created by Polbot